Bradford William Wright (born March 27, 1962, in Hollywood, California), is an American former professional basketball player. He attended Daniel Murphy High School in Los Angeles, and played college basketball for the UCLA Bruins. Wright was drafted by the NBA's Golden State Warriors with the 49th pick of the 1985 NBA draft. He played 14 games with the New York Knicks and 2 games with the Denver Nuggets before injury.

Wright attended the University of California, Los Angeles, where he majored in history. As a senior with the Bruins in 1984–85, he made 10 of 11 field goals, scoring 23 points along with 12 rebounds and four blocked shots in a  win over Louisville in the semifinals of the 1985 National Invitation Tournament. UCLA defeated Indiana in the finals, when Wright held the Hoosiers'  center, Uwe Blab, to 12 points and forced him to foul out with 54 seconds remaining in the game.

References

External links

ACB profile

1962 births
Living people
American expatriate basketball people in France
American expatriate basketball people in Italy
American expatriate basketball people in Spain
American men's basketball players
Basket Rimini Crabs players
Basketball players from Los Angeles
Bàsquet Manresa players
Caen Basket Calvados players
Centers (basketball)
Cincinnati Slammers players
Club Ourense Baloncesto players
Denver Nuggets players
Golden State Warriors draft picks
Libertas Liburnia Basket Livorno players
Liga ACB players
Mens Sana Basket players
New York Knicks players
People from Hollywood, Los Angeles
Power forwards (basketball)
Rockford Lightning players
UCLA Bruins men's basketball players
Wyoming Wildcatters players